Vrelo Bune (Serbian Cyrillic: Врело Буне) is the natural and architectural ensemble at the Buna river spring near Blagaj kasaba (village-town) and a part of the wider "Townscape ensemble of the town of Blagaj — Historical and Natural Heritage of Bosnia and Herzegovina" (Ottoman Mediterranean architecture, 1520), southeast of Mostar, Bosnia and Herzegovina. It is impossible to separate the natural values from the cultural and historical heritage of Blagaj, since its distinctive quality is in the coexistence of the natural and the man-made, in the integration of the physical structure into the landscape.

Vrelo Bune 

The Buna river is a short river in Bosnia and Herzegovina and it is a left bank tributary of the Neretva river. Its source (Bosnian: Vrelo Bune) is a strong karstic spring, emerging from a huge karstic cavern beneath a high vertical cliff. This region is specific for the diversity of its above-ground and underground hydrography. The source of the Buna river is the finest example of an underground karst river. It's one of the largest and most beautiful springs in Europe, producing approx. 30 m3/s with extremely cold and clean water.

Historical and Natural Heritage 
Blagaj is one of the most valuable urban-cum-rural structures in Bosnia and Herzegovina. It reached its peak of development in the 15th and 16th centuries, building in stone also reached its greatest extent. The first stone-built houses were the privilege of the wealthier class, but later, and lower-class families are also built sizeable stone houses and summer residences in large numbers. The natural and architectural ensemble of Blagaj forms a spatially and topographically self-contained ensemble. 
The region is also known for the diversity of its flora and a number of endemic species. At lower altitudes there are many evergreen plant and deciduous thicket species, while at higher altitudes in the hills there is sparse forest. Fertile cultivable land is suitable for the agriculture typical of the Mediterranean climate.

Blagaj Tekke 
The architectural ensemble of the Blagaj Tekija, also known as Takiyya, a Sufi lodge, stands by the source of the Buna river, not far from the centre of Blagaj.  The musafirhana (guest house) and türbe (mausoleum) are tucked into the natural surroundings, constituting a single entity with the cliffs, source of the Buna river and mills. The musafirhana of the Blagaj tekke and the türbe have been preserved to this day. The musafirhana was built before 1664, and rebuilt in 1851 - its original appearance is not known. The building was subsequently repaired on several occasions.  The ensemble of the Blagaj Tekke was presumably built very soon after Ottoman rule was established in Herzegovina, around 1520 at the latest.

Bridges 
There were four bridges over the 9 km of the Buna river, two in Blagaj, one in Kosor and one in Buna village. Blagaj's bridges, the Karađoz-beg bridge and Leho bridge, differ in certain features from the typological form of 16th century Ottoman architecture.
 The Karađoz-beg bridge was endowed by Zaim hajji Mehmed-beg, known as Karađoz, and was built before 1570, on the road to town of Stolac. The bridge has five arches, of increasing span towards the centre.
 The Leho bridge or Lehina ćuprija in Donja Mahala was built before 1664 It is assumed to have been commission by Haseći Ali-aga Kolaković. It had three arches, considerably wider than those of the Karađoz-beg bridge.

Mills 
Mill buildings on the Buna river are simple stone-built structures with gabled roofs clad with stone slabs, and with one or more mills.
 The mills by the Tekke. Very close to the source of the Buna river, channels branch off leading water to power the mills. Several mills, one stamping and two fulling mills were built. There was one on each bank of the river. Part of the mill on the right bank of the river has been converted into a souvenir shop. All that remains of the rest of the structure is the stone walls.
 The mills in the Velagić residential complex. Part of the mill is on the bank and the greater part on the branch of the Buna river that flows beneath the Velagić residential complex. The mill building consists of two parts, one built on dry land with a ground and an upper story, and the other a single-story structure built over the river spanning the two banks by means of a system of arches. The first part was the miller's living quarters, and the other contained seven mills arranged at regular intervals. Stamping mills were used for washing wool and fulling cloth.

Residential quarters 
Residential complexes were entirely isolated in relationship with the outside world, so that the courtyard became the most important area of the house. These complexes consisted of several different buildings serving different purposes, standing on a plot that was entirely open to the natural surroundings and forming a single unit with the architecture of the buildings.
 The Kolaković house is one of the most striking examples of residential architecture in Mediterranean Herzegovina, and illustrates the evolution of the "Ottoman Bosnian" house.
 The Velagić residential complex, built sometime before 1776, is a unique complex of the residential architecture of that time, with a large number of the functional components required for life. Although separated from the outside world, with a high wall enclosure, the interior of the complex is open to the natural environment and the Buna river. All the courtyards are interconnected and paved with river pebbles. The complex of the Velagić house is the most complete example of a family house complex with outbuildings, where the full scope of the residential lifestyle of Mediterranean Herzegovina in the past is revealed.
 The Kosić tower, as an offshoot of mediaeval residential architecture, is a typical fortified house. It is stone-built and stands at the edge of the town, so it probably served as a defensive outpost, given that the Blagaj fortress was on the other side.

UNESCO WHS Nomination 
According to the nomination for the list of national monuments in Bosnia and Herzegovina with the title "Townscape ensemble of the town of Blagaj", drawn up by the Institute for the Protection of the Cultural, Historical and Natural Heritage of Bosnia and Herzegovina, the source of the Buna river with its cliffs constitutes a geomorphological natural monument, and the source of the Buna river a hydrological natural monument. Blagaj's architectural heritage and old urban quarters (mahalas) indicates that buildings of major monumental and townscape value occupy a relatively confined area along the Buna river. Urban structures, spatial physiognomy and organization can be traced from the mediaeval outskirts of the fort, which were transformed in the Ottoman period into a kasaba (village-town). Both Oriental and Mediterranean features are to be seen in Blagaj's urban layout, while the settlement itself was the outcome of the influence of the natural phenomena and configuration of the terrain, as well as socio-economic relations. A perfect harmony between each buildings and its environs was achieved.

See also 
List of karst springs

References

External links 

Velagomed.ba: Natural and architectural ensemble of Blagaj
The natural and architectural ensemble of Blagaj, BiH - UNESCO WHC
Commission to Preserve National Monuments of Bosnia and Herzegovina
Bosnia and Herzegovina - UNESCO World Heritage Centre

Springs of Bosnia and Herzegovina
Karst springs of Bosnia and Herzegovina
SVrelo Bune
Sufi art
Ottoman architecture in Bosnia and Herzegovina
Protected areas of Bosnia and Herzegovina
World Heritage Tentative List
Tourist attractions in Bosnia and Herzegovina
World Heritage Tentative List for Bosnia and Herzegovina
National Monuments of Bosnia and Herzegovina
Karst caves of Bosnia and Herzegovina
Caves of Bosnia and Herzegovina
b
Upper Horizons Hydroelectric Power Stations System
Sufi shrines